The Schröder AS-140 Mücke is a German autogyro, designed and produced by Schröder Expeditions Gyrocopter of Akelsbarg as a portable, man-packable aircraft, supplied as a kit for amateur construction or as a complete ready-to-fly-aircraft.

Design and development
The AS-140 Mücke was designed to be broken down into loads and man-packed on expeditions or shipped to destination and then assembled for use. When broken down  the aircraft can be packed as  length X  width X  height package that weighs . It features a single main rotor, a single-seat open cockpit without a windshield, a T-tail, tricycle landing gear without wheel pants and a  Limbach Flugmotoren or  Rockwell International engine in pusher configuration.

The aircraft fuselage is made from bolted-together aluminum tubing, augmented by stainless steel sheet components.

The aircraft is supplied assembled, but the manufacturer can supply kits upon request.

Specifications (AS-140 Mücke)

References

2000s German sport aircraft
Single-engined pusher autogyros
Homebuilt aircraft